Eisuke (written: 永輔, 英輔, 英介, 栄介, 英助 or エイスケ in katakana) is a masculine Japanese given name. Notable people with the name include:

, Japanese voice actor
, Japanese politician
, Japanese politician
, Japanese footballer
, Japanese writer
, Japanese film director
, Japanese writer

Japanese masculine given names